Ranjin Raj (born 11 December 1988) is an Indian musician and composer who works in the Malayalam film industry. He debuted with the film Joseph which released on 16 November 2018. 

Poomuthole from Joseph, Paal Nilavin from Kaanekkaane and Nangeli Poove from Malikappuram are his notable works.

Personal life

Ranjin was born at Melarcode, Kerala to Mr. M Rajendran and Mrs. Supriya Rajendran, Palakkad. He married Silpa Tulsi on 25 August 2013.

Career
He was a contestant on Idea Star Singer 2007, a music reality show telecasted on Asianet. Ranjin started his career as in-house music producer for media such as Flowers (TV channel), Zee Keralam and his works include Comedy Utsavam and Uppum Mulakum telecasting on Flowers (TV channel).

He associated to director V. A Shrikumar for the film Odiyan, starring Mohanlal, for which he composed scores for two promo videos.

Ranjin Raj started his film career as a musician with the films Nithyaharitha Nayakan and Joseph. His song named Poomuthole from the film Joseph was a hit.

Discography

Awards

References

External links
 

1988 births
Living people